Hero Builder's Guidebook is an accessory for the 3rd edition of the Dungeons & Dragons fantasy role-playing game.

Contents
Hero Builder's Guidebook provides assistance to help develop player characters for 3rd edition Dungeons & Dragons.

Publication history
Hero Builder's Guidebook was published in December 2000, and was designed by Ryan Dancey, David Noonan, and John D. Rateliff. Cover art was by Brom, with interior art by Dennis Cramer.

Reception
The reviewer from Pyramid noted that the Hero Builder's Guidebook "is a companion to the 3rd Edition D&D Player's Handbook, and that alone set my teeth a little on edge when I first took a look at it", concerned that Wizards of the Coast may release too many "indispensable" books rather than allowing the game to stand alone.

References

Dungeons & Dragons sourcebooks
Role-playing game supplements introduced in 2000